Greatest Hits Volume 1 is the first greatest hits album by American country music group Rascal Flatts. It was released on October 28, 2008 by Lyric Street Records. The album includes thirteen of the group's biggest hits from their first four studio albums as well as three newly recorded Christmas songs for a limited time.

The album was reissued on October 6, 2009, with four new live bonus tracks, an audio interview with the band, and a foldout poster.

Track listing
Sources

Bonus tracks

Note: These bonus tracks are on a separate second CD included in a limited edition foiled package for a limited time only.

Note: These bonus tracks are live tracks and are only available on the CD's October 2009 reissue for a limited time only. They are on a separate disc which also includes an audio interview with the band. The liner doubles as a foldout poster.

Personnel
The following musicians performed on the three bonus tracks.

Rascal Flatts
Jay DeMarcus – bass guitar, background vocals
Gary LeVox – lead vocals
Joe Don Rooney –  lead guitar, background vocals, acoustic guitar

Additional musicians
Keith Carlock – drums on "Jingle Bell Rock"
Eric Darken – percussion
Shannon Forrest – drums on "White Christmas"
Jon Gilutin – piano

Horn section on "Jingle Bell Rock"
Mikey Haynes, Steve Patrick, Jeff Bailey – trumpets
Barry Green – trombone
Sam Levine, Dennis Solee, Mark Douthit – saxophones

Violins on "White Christmas": Carl Gorodetzky, Pam Sixfin, Conni Ellisor, Alan Umstead, Mary Kathryn Vanosdale, David Angell, Cathy Umstead, Cate Myer, and Karen Winkelman

String and horn arrangements by David Campbell, strings conducted by Carl Gorodetzky. Vocal arrangement on "I'll Be Home for Christmas" by Mervyn Warren.

Chart performance
Greatest Hits Volume 1 debuted at number 2 on the  U.S. Top Country Albums chart and number 6 on the Billboard 200, with 89,000 copies sold in the first week. In the second week, the album sold another 39,000 copies and remained number 2 on the  U.S. Top Country Albums chart but dipped from number 6 to number 10 on the Billboard 200. It sold 620,000 copies in the United States up to May 2009. The album hit the 1 million mark on February 19, 2011. As October 18, 2012, it has sold 1,266,066 copies in the United States.

Weekly charts

Year-end charts

References

2008 greatest hits albums
Rascal Flatts albums
Lyric Street Records compilation albums